James Fairchild Babcock ( – ) was an American journalist, politician, and judge. 

He began newspaper work at an early age, and in 1830 became editor of the New-Haven Palladium, which soon began to issue a daily edition and which he conducted for thirty-one years. He controlled the nominations of the Whig Party for many years, and, though hostile to the Free-Soil Party at its inception, he finally gave it a hearty welcome in 1854. He retained his prestige with the Republican Party for some years, took an active part in furthering the national cause during the American Civil War, and, shortly after his resignation as editor of the Palladium, was appointed, by President Abraham Lincoln, collector of the port of New Haven. He retained that office under President Andrew Johnson, whose policy he supported; and, after the rupture between the president and the Republicans, Babcock acted with the Democratic Party, and, after an angry and excited contest, was nominated by them for US Congress, but was defeated by the Republican nominee. He was elected by the Democrats to the Connecticut General Assembly in 1873. The legislature of 1874 elected him judge of the police court of New Haven.

James F. Babcock died on 18 June 1874 in New Haven.

References 

  

Created via preloaddraft
1809 births
1874 deaths
Members of the Connecticut General Assembly